Prison Department may refer to:

Department of Prisons (Sri Lanka)
Malaysian Prison Department
National Prison Department (Brazil)
Prison Department, Scotland